Ganisa longipennata is a moth in the family Eupterotidae. It is found in China.

References

Moths described in 1958
Eupterotinae